Jocko River may refer to:

Jocko River (Ontario), Canada
Jocko River (Montana), United States

See also
Little Jocko River, Ontario, Canada